My Cousin the Pirate is a 2010 Danish-Somali documentary film directed by Christian Sønderby Jepsen.

Plot
After the outbreak of the Somali Civil War, Nasib's family sends him to a refugee camp in Europe, but they do not have enough money to send anyone else. Years later, Somalia has become the epicenter of large-scale piracy, and there are pirates from Nasib's family. When he learns that his cousin Abdi is considering becoming a pirate, Nasib returns to his home country to dissuade him from doing so. After following his cousin closely and interacting with the pirates, Nasib makes the argument against piracy, but it carries little weight due to the lack of alternatives in the poverty-stricken country. As Abdi's first raid approaches, Nasib tries to find some hope for his family. The pirates call the hijackings "help yourself foreign aid". Nasib, humbled by his experience, realizes that he could have become a pirate had he remained in Somalia.

Production
After moving to Denmark as a child during the Somali Civil War, Nasib Farah started a youth organization for young Somalis. He later founded Qaran TV, meaning "nation", which offered news, music, debates, and talk shows. Farah became interested in documentary filmmaking, and frequently heard jokes about Somali pirates, so he returned to Somalia to see if anyone in his extended family had become a pirate. Danish TV2 and the Danish Film Institute supported the production of My Cousin the Pirate. It was produced by Helle Faber and directed by Christian Sønderby Jepsen.

Release and reception
The film was screened at the Bergen International Film Festival in Norway. Nasrin Billie wrote that "the film gives a gripping insight to the plight of the Somali people."

References

External links 
 My Cousing the Pirate at the Internet Movie Database

2010 films
Somali-language films
English-language Somalian films
2010 documentary films
Danish documentary films
Somalian documentary films